Ashrafi Esfahani Expressway (Highway) is an expressway in Tehran which runs North-South from Hesarak Road to Second Sadeghiye Square. It passes Punak, Hemmat, Qasem Soleimani and Jalale Ale Ahmad.

Expressways in Tehran